Richard Porter Butrick (1894 Lockport, New York – April 13, 1997 Washington, DC) was the director general of the US Foreign Service from 1949 to 1952.

Butrick, a graduate of the first class of Georgetown University's School of Foreign Service (1921), died from cardiac arrest at Sibley Memorial Hospital at the age of 102.

He was consul general in São Paulo, Brazil, when he retired in 1959 with the rank of career minister.  He was consul general in Montreal (1952–1955) and Minister to Iceland.

References

American consuls
Walsh School of Foreign Service alumni
United States Department of State officials
Ambassadors of the United States to Iceland
Directors General of the United States Foreign Service